Carabus verzhutzkii, is a species of ground beetle in the large genus Carabus.

References 

verzhutzkii
Insects described in 1996